Prem Bahadur Ale Magar (born 28 April 1970) is a Nepali politician belonging to CPN (Unified Socialist). He is also the former Minister of Culture, Tourism and Civil Aviation.  

Before being Tourism Minister, Magar has previously served as the Minister for Forests and Environment of Nepal.

Political life 
He started his career as a local cadre first being elected as a ward member in Doti. After losing by in the 2013 Constituent Assembly, he was elected, in the 2017 general election, as a member of the House of Representatives from Doti 1 constituency.

In 2022, Ale gained widespread popularity after exposing the corruption behind land appropriation in the Narayanhiti Palace by Yogesh Bhattarai. He further accused Bhattarai of taking part in illegal gun smuggling after the end of the Civil War in 2008. He was praised by Prime Minister Sher Bahadur Deuba for his bold actions and he has vowed stern action against those accused in the fraud.

Electoral history

2017 legislative elections

Controversies 
Amidst his catchy moves as a minister Ale recently got mired into controversy as a phone call recording between him and a Nepali national from Accham district leaked. He is heard abusing the person currently in Mumbai for his comments on social media. Ale's secretariat dismissed the recording as fabricated and manipulated to put down on Ale's image by an active conspiracy group.

See also 

 CPN (Unified Socialist)

References 

Government ministers of Nepal
Living people
Communist Party of Nepal (Unified Socialist) politicians
Nepal Communist Party (NCP) politicians
People from Doti District
1971 births
Members of the 2nd Nepalese Constituent Assembly
Nepal MPs 2022–present